Maurice Maina (born 1 January 1963) is a Kenyan boxer. He competed in the men's light flyweight event at the 1988 Summer Olympics.

References

External links
 

1963 births
Living people
Kenyan male boxers
Olympic boxers of Kenya
Boxers at the 1988 Summer Olympics
Commonwealth Games medallists in boxing
Commonwealth Games bronze medallists for Kenya
Boxers at the 1990 Commonwealth Games
African Games gold medalists for Kenya
African Games medalists in boxing
Place of birth missing (living people)
Competitors at the 1987 All-Africa Games
Light-flyweight boxers
Medallists at the 1990 Commonwealth Games